Mohammad Kalhor (born 1956) is an Iranian alpine skier. He competed in three events at the 1976 Winter Olympics.

References

1956 births
Living people
Iranian male alpine skiers
Olympic alpine skiers of Iran
Alpine skiers at the 1976 Winter Olympics
Place of birth missing (living people)